Brentford Football Club is an English professional football club based in Brentford, Hounslow, London. Between 1897 and 1920, the first team competed in the London League, Southern League and Western League. Since 1920, the first team has competed in the Football League, the Premier League and other nationally and internationally organised competitions. All players who won a full international cap during their time with Brentford are listed below.

Records and notable players 

 
Joe Connor was the first Brentford player to be capped at international level, playing and scoring for Ireland in a 2–0 victory over Scotland in March 1903. Henrik Dalsgaard and Mathias Jensen are Brentford's most-capped international players, with 22 caps each for Denmark. Halil Dervişoğlu has scored the most international goals while a Brentford player, with six for Turkey. Kolbeinn Finnsson and Daniel O'Shaughnessy won senior caps for Iceland and Finland respectively, without making a first team appearance for Brentford. In March 2021, the total number of caps won by contracted Brentford players passed 200.

In June 2018, Henrik Dalsgaard became Brentford's first contracted player to play at a major international tournament, when he started in Denmark's opening match at the 2018 World Cup. By 2021, Brentford players had also made appearances at the Africa Cup of Nations and the European Championship. In September 2022, Ivan Toney became the first Brentford player to be named in an England matchday squad since Les Smith in May 1939. The club record for players called up during an international break is 18, with 10 winning caps. 

Current Brentford players who have been capped at full international level while contracted to the club are Kristoffer Ajer, Mikkel Damsgaard, Halil Dervişoğlu, Tariqe Fosu, Saman Ghoddos, Aaron Hickey, Pontus Jansson, Mathias Jensen, Bryan Mbeumo, Christian Nørgaard, Frank Onyeka, Ethan Pinnock, David Raya, Thomas Strakosha and Yoane Wissa.

Key
Appearance and goal totals for full internationals include all FIFA-sanctioned matches. Substitute appearances are included. Wartime matches are regarded as unofficial and are excluded.
 Statistics are correct as of matches played 6 December 2022.

Playing positions

Players

Other senior international appearances

Olympic Games/U23

B international

Wartime and Victory internationals

Amateur

Representative

Other

Youth international players

U21

U20

U19

U18/Youth

U17

U16/Schoolboys

U15

Awards 

 2021 UEFA European U21 Championship Squad of the Tournament: Mads Bech Sørensen
 2022 UEFA European U19 Championship Team of the Tournament: Matthew Cox

Notes

References
General

Specific

Internationals
Internationals
Association football player non-biographical articles